Tonka is a 1958 American Western film directed by Lewis R. Foster and starring Sal Mineo as a Sioux who survived the Battle of the Little Big Horn. The film is based on the book Comanche: Story of America's Most Heroic Horse by David Appel, the movie depicts the fictional story of the Indian and US Cavalry owners of the titular horse.

It was filmed in Bend, Oregon, and distributed by Buena Vista Distribution, a division of Walt Disney Productions.

Plot
White Bull, a young Sioux, captures a wild stallion he names Tonka, and trains him. He must give the horse to his bad-tempered cousin, Yellow Bull, who abuses Tonka to try and break his spirit. White Bull lets the horse escape, and Tonka is captured by the U.S. Cavalry. Captain Keogh rides Tonka at the Battle of Little Big Horn, and the horse is the only survivor of the massacre. When Captain Keogh is killed Tonka rises up and kills Keogh's killer. White Bull joins the cavalry, and is given the duty of looking after Tonka, who has received an honorable discharge from further battle duties.

Cast
Sal Mineo as White Bull
Philip Carey as Captain Myles Keogh
Jerome Courtland as Lieutenant Henry Nowlan
Rafael Campos as Strong Bear
H. M. Wynant as Yellow Bear
Joy Page as Prairie Flower
Britt Lomond as General George Custer
Herbert Rudley as Captain Frederick Benteen
Sydney Smith as General Alfred Terry
John War Eagle as Chief Sitting Bull
Gregg Martell as Corporal Korn
Slim Pickens as Ace
Robert "Buzz" Henry as Lieutenant Crittenden
Eddie Little Sky as Spotted Tail

Production
Tonka was filmed in Bend and Madras, Oregon.

References

External links
  

1958 films
Walt Disney Pictures films
American Western (genre) films
1958 Western (genre) films
Western (genre) cavalry films
Films based on Western (genre) novels
Films about horses
Films scored by Oliver Wallace
Cultural depictions of George Armstrong Custer
Cultural depictions of Sitting Bull
Films directed by Lewis R. Foster
Films shot in Bend, Oregon
1950s English-language films
1950s American films